Hibbertia mollis is a species of flowering plant in the family Dilleniaceae and is endemic to a restricted part of Western Australia. It is a shrub with hairy, ridged branches, narrow elliptic-oblong leaves, and yellow flowers arranged singly in leaf axils with about twenty-four stamens arranged in bundles around two densely scaly carpels.

Description
Flowering occurs in June.

Taxonomy
Hibbertia mollis was first formally described in 2010 by Hellmut R. Toelken in the Journal of the Adelaide Botanic Gardens from specimens collected near Prince Frederick Harbour in 1985. The specific epithet (mollis) means "soft", referring to the hairs on the foliage of this species.

Distribution and habitat
This hibbertia is only known from the type specimen that was growing on a sandstone outcrop at the mouth of the Hunter River in the Northern Kimberley biogeographic region of Western Australia.

Conservation status
Hibbertia mollis is only known from the type specimen but is classified as "not threatened" by the Western Australian Government Department of Parks and Wildlife.

See also
List of Hibbertia species

References

mollis
Eudicots of Western Australia
Plants described in 2010
Taxa named by Hellmut R. Toelken